This list of lost, damaged, or destroyed dinosaur specimens enumerates those fossil dinosaur specimens that have been discovered only to be lost or damaged after initial documentation. Some of these specimens which had gone missing were later recovered as well.

Uncollected specimens

Destroyed specimens

Lost specimens

Damaged specimens

Recovered specimens

Footnotes

References
 Carpenter, K. (2006). "Biggest of the big: a critical re-evaluation of the mega-sauropod Amphicoelias fragillimus." In Foster, J.R. and Lucas, S.G., eds., 2006, Paleontology and Geology of the Upper Jurassic Morrison Formation. New Mexico Museum of Natural History and Science Bulletin 36: 131–138.
 Spalding, D. A., 2001, Bones of contention: Charles H. Sternberg's lost world:  In: Mesozoic Vertebrate Life, edited by Tanke, D. H., and Carpenter, K., Indiana  University Press, pp. 481–503.

Lists of dinosaur specimens